Deanna Morse is an independent American experimental filmmaker and media artist. Her work is included in collections at the Metropolitan Museum of Art.

She has been a member of the Academy of Motion Picture Arts and Sciences since 2020.

Early life and education
Morse graduated from Iowa State University with a degree in telecommunicative arts and distributed studies in 1972. She received an M.A. in film and teaching at Goddard College, and in 1992 received a Master of Fine Arts (art and technology), with a merit scholarship from the School of the Art Institute of Chicago. In 1995, she was awarded an outstanding alumni award by Iowa State University.

Career 
After graduation she became an assistant editor at WGBH-TV in Boston, and also worked as a scriptwriter for the Virginia Department of Education, and on a series about desegregation for Virginia PBS. She was then hired as an artist in residence for the South Carolina Arts Commission, where she taught for four years, and was filmmaker-in-schools in 1975–1976.

She taught at the College of Charleston, at Regis College, and then at Grand Valley State University in Allendale, Michigan, for thirty-three years, retiring as an Emerita Professor in 2013. During her time at GVSU, she released the retrospective and interactive DVD Move Click Move in 2001 and used the proceeds to fund scholarships. There she also created, together with some of her students, a Flash animation for the international participatory project Flag Metamorphoses

Her film Lost Ground was part of the 1992 SIGGRAPH Art Show. She was chair of the SIGGRAPH 1994 Art and Design Show, and a juror for the art show in 1998.

She has judged festivals and computer graphics competitions including the Hiroshima International Animation Festival in Japan and the Ann Arbor Film Festival.

She has published articles in Animation World Network.

Filmography
She has made several films for Sesame Street, including Dogs (1991), Monkey's T-Shirt (1991), and Night Sounds (1992).

Hyperallergic wrote about her 1989 animated film Plants that "The play of light, color, line, and shape can be mesmerizing ... vegetal patterns move and spin to evoke plants". Plants was also reviewed by the Chicago Reader, which noted that she " ... creates still-life portraits of flowers using rudimentary (but then-sophisticated) computer drawing tools".

Awards
 1993 - Named a distinguished professor by the Michigan Association of Governing Boards of State Universities.
 1995 - Outstanding Alumni Award from Iowa State University
 2002 - Addy Award for Move Click Move DVD
 2003 - Omni Award for Move Click Move DVD
 2005 - Selected as an outstanding woman in the arts by the YWCA
 2015 - Hyperion Award, 9th Eclipse Awards honoring Michigan's filmmakers and television creators
Honored in the Plaza of Heroines at Carrie Chapman Catt Hall at Iowa State University.

References

Further reading
 Giannalberto Bendazzi: ANIMATION: A World History, Volume 3, Contemporary Times, 2015. P. 46: Women in the Limelight, Deanna Morse
 Karen Sullivan, Kate Alexander, Aubry Mintz and Ellen Besen: Ideas for the Animated Short: Finding and Building Stories, Focal Press, 2013, pages 139–141
 Juliet Davis: Review of MOVE-CLICK-MOVE by Deanna Morse, Journal of Film and Video, winter 2006.
 Pilling, Jayne, ed: Women and Animation: a Compendium. British Film Institute, 1992. 
 Russett, Robert; Starr, Cecile: Experimental Animation, origins of a new art. Da Capo Press, New York, N.Y., 1988.  (p. 22-23)

External links
 
 Animations by Deanna Morse on her YouTube channel
 The Film-Makers' Coop - Deanna Morse

Living people
1950 births
American women film directors
People from Sioux City, Iowa
Iowa State University alumni
Goddard College alumni